Elena Goh Ling Yin (born 29 April 1996) is a Malaysian race walker. She won the gold medal in the 10,000 metres event at the 2017 Southeast Asian Games

International competitions

References

External links

1996 births
Living people
Malaysian female racewalkers
People from Malacca
Malaysian people of Chinese descent
Southeast Asian Games medalists in athletics
Southeast Asian Games gold medalists for Malaysia
Competitors at the 2017 Southeast Asian Games
Competitors at the 2019 Southeast Asian Games
Southeast Asian Games bronze medalists for Malaysia
21st-century Malaysian women